is a railway station on the Hohi Main Line operated by JR Kyushu in Kita-ku, Kumamoto, Japan.

Lines

Layout 
The station consists of an island platform serving two tracks at grade. The station building is a modern concrete hashigami structure where the station facilities are located on a bridge which spans the tracks and which provides entrances to the station and a free passage to access roads on both sides of the tracks. The second level of the bridge houses a waiting area and a staffed ticket window. Elevators provide access from the station entrances to the second level, and from the second level to the island platform. The island platform has an enclosed, air-conditioned, shelter for waiting passengers.

Management of the station has been outsourced to the JR Kyushu Tetsudou Eigyou Co., a wholly owned subsidiary of JR Kyushu specialising in station services. It staffs the ticket window which is equipped with a Midori no Madoguchi facility.

Adjacent stations

History
JR Kyushu opened the station on 18 March 2006 as an additional station on the existing track of the Hōhi Main Line.

Passenger statistics
In fiscal 2016, the station was used by an average of 2,609 passengers daily (boarding passengers only), and it ranked 72nd among the busiest stations of JR Kyushu.

See also
List of railway stations in Japan

References

External links
Hikarinomori Station (JR Kyushu)

Railway stations in Kumamoto Prefecture
Railway stations in Japan opened in 1981
Railway stations in Japan opened in 2006